Vermont Route 63 (VT 63) is a short  state highway in Washington County, Vermont, United States. It connects Interstate 89 (I-89) in Berlin to VT 14 south of the city of Barre.

Route description
VT 63 begins as an offshoot of Interstate 89 at exit 6 in Berlin. VT 63 stays to the south, running mostly due east for about  before terminating at an intersection with VT 14 in South Barre, a census-designated place within the town of Barre. VT 63 mainly functions as an alternate route to VT 62, providing access to Barre while avoiding the Edward F. Knapp State Airport and the Berlin Mall area to the north.

Major intersections

References

External links

063
Transportation in Washington County, Vermont